Mark Henderson (born 1957) is a British lighting designer who won the 2006 Tony Award for Best Lighting Design for The History Boys.

Henderson began his Broadway career with a 1986 comedy revue starring Rowan Atkinson. His Broadway credits include revivals of The Merchant of Venice (1989), Cat on a Hot Tin Roof (1990), Hamlet (1995), The Iceman Cometh (1999), The Real Thing (2000), Faith Healer (2006), and A Moon for the Misbegotten (2007), and the original productions of Indiscretions (1995), Copenhagen (2000), Decocracy (2004),  Chitty Chitty Bang Bang (2005), and Deuce (2007).

In the UK, Henderson has worked at the Almeida Theatre, the Donmar Warehouse, the Royal National Theatre, and the Old Vic. He has designed projects for the Really Useful Group, the Royal Shakespeare Company, the Royal Opera, the English National Opera, the Welsh National Opera, the Scottish Opera, and the Royal Ballet, among others. He was involved in the refurbishment of the Royal Court Theatre and has designed for Madame Tussauds in London, New York City, and Las Vegas.

Henderson's West End productions include Arsenic and Old Lace, Grease, West Side Story, Spend Spend Spend, Follies, Carmen Jones, The Duck House and Three Sisters. He also has designed tours for Eddie Izzard, Victoria Wood, French & Saunders, Ruby Wax, and Steve Coogan. Most recently he has worked on the much acclaimed Kate Bush Before the Dawn at the Hammersmith Apollo. Designed the 360 degree Peter Pan.

Henderson has been nominated for the Tony Award for Faith Healer, Chitty Chitty Bang Bang, The Iceman Cometh, and Indiscretions and the Drama Desk Award for Chitty Chitty Bang Bang and Indiscretions. He has won the Laurence Olivier Award for Best Lighting Design five times out of nine nominations. In 2013 he designed the National Theatres 50 years on Stage celebration.

References

External links

Mark Henderson credits at PBJ Management

1957 births
Lighting designers
People from Mansfield
Tony Award winners
Living people